The 2000–01 National Division Three North was the first season (fourteenth overall) of the fourth division (north) of the English domestic rugby union competition using the name National Division Three North.  New teams to the division included Dudley Kingswinford who were promoted as the champions of Midlands Division 1 and Tynedale who were champions of North Division 1 with no northern based teams being relegated from the 1999-00 Jewson National League One.  The league system was 2 points for a win and 1 point for a draw with the promotion system changing for this season with a playoff system being introduced.  The champions of both National Division Three North and National Division Three South would automatically go up but the runners up of these two divisions would meet each other in a one off match (at the home ground of the side with the superior league record) to see who would claim the third and final promotion place to National Division Two for the following season.

The season was a very fractured one due to the 2001 United Kingdom foot-and-mouth outbreak  which primarily affected the two northernmost clubs in the division - Aspatria and Tynedale - leading to a large number of fixtures being cancelled in the latter half of the season. The league champions  were Stourbridge who pipped Sedgley Park to the league title by just one point to gain promotion to the 2001–02 National Division Two.  Sedgley Park would join them soon after when they won their promotion playoff game at home against the 2000-01 National Division Three South runners up Launceston in front of over 1,000 fans.  The foot-and-mouth outbreak made relegation far from straightforward as initially the bottom two were Aspatria and Tynedale, who had played 18 games each - less than any of the other teams in the division.  In Tynedale's case this was particularly hard as they were only 1 point behind 12th placed Sandal but had played six games less.  In the end the RFU had to re-think relegation and used a complicated process based on early season form which meant that 14th placed Aspatria and 11th placed Walsall went down.  Aspatria dropped to North Division 1 while Walsall went into Midlands Division 1.

Participating teams and locations

Final league table

Results
Be aware that some of the early season scores from Rugby Statbunker may be incorrect (possibly due to an automatic scoring system used on that website) as they are different from those reported in the Telegraph.  I have used references from the Telegraph wherever possible which should tie in with the results from the England rugby website.

Round 1

Round 2 

Postponed.  Game rescheduled to 23 September 2000.

Postponed.  Game rescheduled to 23 September 2000.

Postponed.  Game rescheduled to 23 September 2000.

Round 3 

Postponed.  Game rescheduled to 21 October 2001.

Postponed.  Game rescheduled to 3 February 2001.

Round 2 & 3 (rescheduled games) 

Game rescheduled from 10 September 2000.

Game brought forward from 10 February 2001.

Game rescheduled from 10 September 2000.

Game rescheduled from 10 September 2000.

Round 4

Round 5

Round 3 (rescheduled game) 

Game rescheduled from 16 September 2000.

Round 6

Round 7 

Postponed.  Game rescheduled to 3 February 2001.

Postponed.  Game rescheduled to 3 February 2001.

Round 8

Round 9

Round 10

Round 11 

Postponed.  Game rescheduled to 3 February 2001.

Round 12 

Postponed.  Game rescheduled to 17 February 2001.

Postponed.  Game rescheduled to 17 February 2001.

Postponed.  Game rescheduled to 17 February 2001.

Round 13 

Postponed.  Game rescheduled to 3 March 2001.

Postponed.  Game rescheduled to 17 February 2001.

Round 14

Round 15 

Postponed.  Game rescheduled to 3 March 2001.

Postponed.  Game rescheduled to ?.

Postponed.  Game rescheduled to 3 February 2001.

Postponed.  Game rescheduled to 3 February 2001.

Postponed.  Game rescheduled to 3 February 2001.

Postponed.  Game rescheduled to 3 March 2001.

Postponed.  Game rescheduled to 3 March 2001.

Round 16

Round 17 

Postponed.  Game rescheduled to 7 April 2001.

Round 18 

Postponed.  Game rescheduled to 7 April 2001.

Postponed.  Game rescheduled to 21 April 2001.

Postponed.  Game rescheduled to 17 February 2001.

Game initially postponed but would ultimately be cancelled due to foot & mouth crisis in northern England cutting short Tynedale's season and leading to them being relegated.

Postponed.  Game rescheduled to 3 March 2001.

Round 19

Rounds 3, 7, 11 & 15 (rescheduled games) 

Game rescheduled from 30 December 2000.

Game rescheduled from 30 December 2000.

Game rescheduled from 4 November 2000.

Game rescheduled from 30 December 2000.

Game rescheduled from 16 September 2000.

Game rescheduled from 4 November 2000.

Game rescheduled from 2 December 2000.

Round 20 

Game brought forward to 23 September 2000.

Game initially postponed but would ultimately be cancelled due to foot & mouth crisis in northern England cutting short Aspatria's season and leading to them being relegated.

Game initially postponed but would ultimately be cancelled due to foot & mouth crisis in northern England cutting short Tynedale's season and leading to them being relegated.

Rounds 12, 13 & 18 (rescheduled games) 

Game rescheduled from 9 December 2000.

Game rescheduled from 20 January 2001.

Game rescheduled from 9 December 2000.

Game rescheduled from 16 December 2000.

Game rescheduled from 9 December 2000.

Round 21

Rounds 13, 15 & 18 (rescheduled games) 

Game rescheduled from 16 December 2000.

Game initially rescheduled from 30 December 2000 but would be postponed again until 28 April 2001.

Game initially rescheduled from 30 December 2000 but would be postponed again until 28 April 2001.

Game initially rescheduled from 30 December 2000 but would be postponed again until 14 April 2001.

Game initially rescheduled from 20 January 2001 but would be ultimately cancelled due to fixture congestion.

Round 22 

Postponed.  Game rescheduled to 5 May 2001.

Postponed.  Game rescheduled to 19 May 2001.

Round 23 

Postponed.  Game rescheduled to ?.

Postponed.  Game rescheduled to 28 April 2001.

Game initially postponed but would ultimately be cancelled due to foot & mouth crisis in northern England cutting short Tynedale's season and leading to them being relegated.

Postponed.  Game rescheduled to 21 April 2001.

Round 24 

Postponed.  Game rescheduled to 19 May 2001.

Postponed.  Game rescheduled to 19 May 2001.

Postponed.  Game rescheduled to 5 May 2001.

Round 25 

Postponed.  Game rescheduled to 26 May 2001.

Postponed.  Game rescheduled to 26 May 2001.

Rounds 15, 17 & 18 (rescheduled games) 

Game rescheduled from 20 January 2001.

Game initially postponed but would ultimately be cancelled due to foot & mouth crisis in northern England cutting short Aspatria's season and leading to them being relegated.

Game initially rescheduled from 30 December 2000 but postponed again till 5 May 2001.

Round 26 (includes rescheduled game) 

Game initially rescheduled from 30 December 2000, then 3 March 2001.

Postponed.  Game rescheduled to 5 May 2001.

Game initially postponed but would ultimately be cancelled due to foot & mouth crisis in northern England cutting short Tynedale's season and leading to them being relegated.

Rounds 18 & 23 (rescheduled games) 

Game rescheduled from 20 January 2001.

Game rescheduled from 7 March 2001.

Rounds 15 & 23 (rescheduled games) 

Game rescheduled from 17 March 2001.

Game initially rescheduled from 30 December 2000 and then 3 March 2001 before finally being cancelled due to foot & mouth crisis in northern England cutting short Aspatria's season and leading to them being relegated.

Game initially rescheduled from 30 December 2000 and then 3 March 2001 before finally being cancelled due to foot & mouth crisis in northern England cutting short Tynedale's season and leading to them being relegated.

Rounds 22 & 24 & ? (rescheduled games) 

Game initially rescheduled from 30 December 2000 and then again from 7 April 2001.

Game rescheduled from 14 April 2001 but would ultimately be cancelled due to foot & mouth crisis in northern England cutting short Aspatria's season and leading to them being relegated.

Game rescheduled from 10 March 2001 but would ultimately be cancelled due to foot & mouth crisis in northern England cutting short Tynedale's season and leading to them being relegated.

Game rescheduled from 24 March 2001 but would ultimately be cancelled due to fixture congestion.

Rounds 22 & 24 (rescheduled games) 

Game initially rescheduled from 24 March 2001 but would ultimately be cancelled due to foot & mouth crisis in northern England cutting short Aspatria's season and leading to them being relegated.

Game initially rescheduled from 24 March 2001 but would ultimately be cancelled due to foot & mouth crisis in northern England cutting short Tynedale's season and leading to them being relegated.

Game initially rescheduled from 10 March 2001 but ultimately cancelled due to fixture congestion.

Round 25 (rescheduled games) 

Game initially rescheduled from 31 March 2001 but would ultimately be cancelled due to foot & mouth crisis in northern England cutting short Tynedale's season and leading to them being relegated.

Game initially rescheduled from 31 March 2001 but would ultimately be cancelled due to foot & mouth crisis in northern England cutting short Aspatria's season and leading to them being relegated.

Promotion play-off
The league runners up of National Division Three North and South would meet in a playoff game for promotion to National Division Two.  Sedgley Park were runners-up in the north and because they had a better league record than south runners-up, Launceston, they hosted the play-off match.

Total season attendances 
Not including promotion playoff game.

Individual statistics 

 Note that points scorers includes tries as well as conversions, penalties and drop goals.

Top points scorers

Top try scorers

Season records

Team
Largest home win — 79 pts
79 - 0 New Brighton at home to Morley on 9 December 2000
Largest away win — 42 pts
53 - 11 Doncaster away to Sandal on 14 October 2000
Most points scored — 79 pts
79 - 0 New Brighton at home to Morley on 9 December 2000
Most tries in a match — 13
New Brighton at home to Morley on 9 December 2000
Most conversions in a match — 13
New Brighton at home to Morley on 9 December 2000
Most penalties in a match — 7
Tynedale away to Liverpool St Helens on 2 September 2000
Most drop goals in a match — 2
Liverpool St Helens away to Bedford Athletic on 18 November 2000

Player
Most points in a match — 34
 Paul Brett for New Brighton at home to Morley on 9 December 2000
Most tries in a match — 4 (x2)
 Mike Wilcox for Sedgley Park at home to Whitchurch on 2 December 2000
 Steve Belis for New Brighton at home to Morley on 9 December 2000
Most conversions in a match — 13
 Paul Brett for New Brighton at home to Morley on 9 December 2000
Most penalties in a match —  7
 Alan Moses for Tynedale away to Liverpool St Helens on 2 September 2000
Most drop goals in a match —  2
 Simon Worsley for Liverpool St Helens away to Bedford Athletic on 18 November 2000

Attendances
Highest — 1,500 (x2)
Dudley Kingswinford at home to Stourbridge on 16 December 2000 
Stourbridge at home to Dudley Kingswinford on 31 March 2001
Lowest — 100 (x2) 
Aspatria at home to Sedgley Park on 18 November 2000 
Aspatria at home to Tynedale on 2 December 2000  
Highest Average Attendance — 691
Doncaster
Lowest Average Attendance — 145
Aspatria

See also
 English Rugby Union Leagues
 English rugby union system
 Rugby union in England

References

External links
 NCA Rugby

2000-01
2000–01 in English rugby union leagues